Mário José dos Reis Emiliano (23 May 1957 – 15 June 2020), commonly known as Marinho, was a Brazilian professional footballer and assistant manager of Bangu. He played as a right winger.

He competed in the men's tournament at the 1976 Summer Olympics.

Marinho died on 15 June 2020 after fighting pancreatitis and prostate cancer.

References

External links

 
 
 
 
 

1957 births
2020 deaths
Association football forwards
Brazilian footballers
Brazil international footballers
Afro-Brazilian sportspeople
Botafogo de Futebol e Regatas players
Campeonato Brasileiro Série A players
Deaths from pancreatitis
Deaths from prostate cancer
Deaths from cancer in Minas Gerais
Footballers at the 1976 Summer Olympics
Olympic footballers of Brazil
Footballers from Belo Horizonte